This article shows a list of largest cities and towns in Iraq.

List

Largest cities

Ancient cities and towns

 Babylon (ܒܒܝܠ) (بابل)
 Ctesiphon (Al-Mada'in, المدائن)
 Eridu (إريدو)
 Hatra (حضر)
 Kish (كيش)
 Lagash (لجش)
 Nineveh (ܢܝܢܘܐ) (نينوى)
 Nippur (نيبور)
 Nuzi (Nuzu)
 Samarra
 Shenna (Sinn Barimma)
 Sumer (سومر)
 Tell Ubaid (تل عبيد)
 Ur (أور)
 Uruk (أوروك)

See also
List of places in Iraq
Districts of Iraq

References

External links
 

 
Populated places in Iraq
Iraq, List of cities in
Cities
Iraq